Parkwood School International (PSI) was a co-educational residential school, about 65 km away from Hyderabad, Telangana, India. Parkwood provided education for children from grade 3 to 12. The school once offered CBSE, University of Cambridge IGCSE and A-Levels.

Location 

Curriculum 
Parkwood was previously affiliated with the Central Board of Secondary Education, prior to the license being suspended by that board. The school offered courses from the national CBSE and the international IGCSE and A-Levels.

Controversy 
The school was in the news when its director was arrested by police and found guilty of raping a student. In Nov/Dec 2011, charge sheets were filed after a delay of 18 months.

The school has been stripped of its recognition by CBSE because of the gross violations of the norms.

References

External links 

 

Educational institutions established in 2003
International schools in Hyderabad, India
2003 establishments in Andhra Pradesh